Crockett Lake is a lake in Island County, Washington at an elevation of .

The Crockett family homesteaded the site in the 1850s, and gave the lake their name.

See also
List of lakes in Washington

References

Bodies of water of Island County, Washington
Lakes of Washington (state)